The women's handball tournament at the 2015 Pan American Games in Toronto, Canada was held at the Exhibition Centre (in Hall B) from July 16 to 24.

For these Games, the women competed in an 8-team tournament. The teams were grouped into two pools of four teams each for a round-robin preliminary round. The top two teams in each group advanced to a single elimination bracket.

Brazil were the defending champions from the 2011 Pan American Games in Guadalajara, defeating Argentina, 33–15 in the final.

The winner of the tournament were to qualify for the 2016 Summer Olympics in Rio de Janeiro, Brazil, while the 2nd and the 3rd place (due to the continental rankings at the World Championship) qualified for the Olympic Qualification Tournament. As the host nation Brazil won, the runner up qualified instead, in accordance with the regulations.

Qualification
A total of eight women's teams qualified to compete at the games. The top three teams at the South American and Central American and Caribbean Games qualified, along with the host nation Canada. The United States and Uruguay competed against one another in a home/away playoff for the last spot in the tournament. The fourth placed team in the Central American and Caribbean Games both declined to compete in the respective tournaments.

Summary

Last chance qualification tournament

Rosters

At the start of tournament, all eight participating countries had up to 15 players on their rosters.

Draw
The draw for the competition took place on March 15, 2015 in Montevideo, Uruguay.

Results
The official detailed schedule was revealed on April 26, 2015.

All times are Eastern Daylight Time (UTC−4)

Preliminary round

Group A

Group B

Classification round

Semifinals

Seventh place match

Fifth place match

Medal round

Semifinals

Bronze medal match

Gold medal match

Final ranking

Note: As Brazil were already qualified for the olympics as hosts, the qualification slot went to Argentina instead and Mexico qualified for the Olympic Qualification Tournament instead of Argentina.

Statistics

Top scorers

Top Goalkeepers

References

Handball at the 2015 Pan American Games
Women's handball in Canada
2015 in women's handball